The 1900 Kansas gubernatorial election was held on November 6, 1900. Incumbent Republican William Eugene Stanley defeated People's Party nominee John W. Breidenthal with 52.25% of the vote.

General election

Candidates
Major party candidates 
William Eugene Stanley, Republican

Other candidates
John W. Breidenthal, People's 
G. C. Clemens, Social Democratic
Frank Holsinger, Prohibition

Results

References

1900
Kansas
Gubernatorial